Rheinpfeil (German - Rhine arrow) may mean:

 The , a Raketa-type hydrofoil boat
 The Rheinpfeil (train), which ran between 1952 and 2002